Hypsolebias magnificus is a species of killifish in the family Rivulidae native the Middle São Francisco River basin in Brazil. It grows to  TL.

It was formerly included in the genus Simpsonichthys but has been recently reclassified.

References 

Rivulidae
Freshwater fish of Brazil
Endemic fauna of Brazil
Fish described in 1991